Skärhamn is a locality and the seat of Tjörn Municipality, Västra Götaland County, Sweden with 3,193 inhabitants in 2010. The main tourist attraction in Skärhamn besides yachting is The Nordic Watercolour Museum (Akvarellmuseet).

Sports
The following sports clubs are located in Skärhamn:

 Skärhamns IK

References

External links 

Municipal seats of Västra Götaland County
Swedish municipal seats
Populated places in Västra Götaland County
Populated places in Tjörn Municipality